A century ago, in Johannesburg Consolidated Investment Co v Johannesburg Town Council, Innes CJ distinguished only three types of judicial review in the South African system:

 review of the decisions of inferior courts;
 the common-law review of decisions of administrative authorities; and
 a "wider" form of statutory review.

These three forms of review still exist today, but the list has been expanded as a result of modern developments, including and most especially the Constitution. Among the latest additions are

 automatic review, which allows the decisions of inferior courts to be reconsidered in the absence of an application for review;
 constitutional review, a form of review that did not exist in South Africa before 1994, but which the existence of a supreme constitution with a justiciable Bill of Rights permits; and
 what used to be common-law review in administrative law but has now largely been constitutionalised by section 33 of the Constitution and placed on a statutory footing by the Promotion of Administrative Justice Act (PAJA).

Forms of judicial review

Review of the proceedings of inferior courts 
The High Courts may be asked to review the proceedings of inferior courts, such as magistrates' courts and small claims courts, on grounds set out in section 24 of the Supreme Court Act. The grounds are absence of jurisdiction, bias or corruption on the part of the presiding officer, gross irregularity in the proceedings, and the admission of inadmissible evidence.

Automatic review 
Certain statutes make provision for the decisions of magistrates or other judicial officers to be reviewed "automatically" by judges, meaning that the review is not initiated by an aggrieved individual but takes place by virtue of a statutory trigger. Probably the best-known example is section 302 of the Criminal Procedure Act, which provides for the automatic review by judges of certain sentences imposed by magistrates. Another example is section 19(3) of the Extension of Security of Tenure Act, which provides for the automatic review of orders of eviction granted in the magistrates’ courts.

Judicial review in the constitutional sense 
In constitutional law "judicial review" usually means the power of the courts to scrutinise and declare unconstitutional any type of legislation, original or delegated, or state conduct that infringes on rights in the Bill of Rights (such as the right to equality or the right to privacy) or otherwise offends against provisions of the Constitution. As a result of the constitutionalisation of administrative law, review in the administrative-law sense is now largely a species of constitutional review.

Judicial review in the administrative-law sense 
In administrative law "judicial review" refers more specifically to the power of the courts to scrutinise and set aside administrative decisions or rules (delegated legislation) on the basis of certain grounds of review. In the pre-democratic era this was an inherent power of the Supreme Court and was governed by the common law. Today this type of review is regulated indirectly by section 33 of the Constitution and directly by PAJA. Thus judicial review in the administrative-law sense is now principally a statutory matter. When PAJA is not of application for whatever reason, this type of review will be governed either by other principles of the Constitution, chiefly section 1(c) (where public powers are concerned) or by the common law in the case of private powers. The point of providing for review was to make it more accessible.

Special statutory review 
The legislature may and often does confer on the courts a statutory power of review. This is "special" because it differs from "ordinary" judicial review in the administrative-law sense (as now governed by PAJA). It is sometimes a wider power than ordinary review, and thus more akin to an appeal, but it may well be narrower, with the court confined to particular grounds of review or particular remedies. While Innes CJ spoke of the statutory review power as being "far wider" than the first two kinds of review mentioned by him, "it is clear that the precise extent of the power always depends on the particular statutory provision concerned." This was recognised by Van Heerden JA for a unanimous Supreme Court of Appeal in Nel NO v The Master.

The statute book is replete with examples of special statutory review. One example is the review of decisions made in terms of the Promotion of Access to Information Act (PAIA), which takes place on grounds to be gleaned from that statute. Others are the review of a "decision, ruling, order or taxation" of the Master in terms of section 151 of the Insolvency Act and the provision in section 145 of the Labour Relations Act for review of arbitration awards made by the Commission for Conciliation, Mediation and Arbitration (CCMA). The review of private (consensual) arbitration takes place in terms of section 33(1) of the Arbitration Act on grounds that overlap somewhat with those applying to the proceedings of inferior courts.

Administrative law 
The first two types of review listed above are not of much relevance to administrative law, although there is some overlap between the grounds for reviewing the decisions of inferior courts and the grounds for reviewing the decisions of administrators. For the most part, the term "judicial review"—when used in the context of administrative law, and when used without qualification—means the review of administrative decisions and delegated legislation. Special statutory review is also a concern of administrative law, as it generally operates as an alternative or potential alternative to the review of administrative decisions and delegated legislation under the PAJA.

See also 
 South African administrative law

Notes

References 
 C. Hoexter Administrative Law in South Africa 2 ed (2012).

Law of South Africa
South Africa